Ceratophyllus columbae is a species of flea in the family Ceratophyllidae. It was described by Gervais in 1844.

References 

Ceratophyllidae
Insects described in 1844
Arthropods of Colombia